King Kong is a 1933 American pre-Code adventure horror monster film directed and produced by Merian C. Cooper and Ernest B. Schoedsack, with special effects by Willis H. O'Brien. Produced and distributed by RKO Radio Pictures, it is the first film in the King Kong franchise. The film stars Fay Wray, Robert Armstrong and Bruce Cabot. In the film, a giant ape dubbed Kong attempts to possess a beautiful young woman.

King Kong opened in New York City on March 2, 1933, to rave reviews, and has since been ranked by Rotten Tomatoes as the greatest horror film of all time and the fifty-sixth greatest film of all time. In 1991, it was deemed "culturally, historically and aesthetically significant" by the Library of Congress and selected for preservation in the National Film Registry. A sequel, titled Son of Kong, was fast-tracked and released the same year, with several more films made in the following decades, including two remakes that were made in 1976 and 2005 respectively, and a reboot in 2017.

Plot

In New York Harbor, filmmaker Carl Denham, known for wildlife films in remote and exotic locations, charters Captain Englehorn's ship, the Venture, for his new project. However, he is unable to secure an actress for a female role he has been reluctant to disclose. Searching in the streets of New York City, he finds Ann Darrow and promises her the adventure of a lifetime. The crew boards the Venture and sets off, during which the ship's first mate, Jack Driscoll, falls in love with Ann. Denham reveals to the crew that their destination is in fact Skull Island, an uncharted territory. He alludes to a mysterious entity named Kong, rumored to dwell on the island. The crew arrives and anchor offshore. They encounter a native village, separated from the rest of the island by an enormous stone wall with a large wooden gate. They witness a group of natives preparing to sacrifice a young woman termed the "bride of Kong". The intruders are spotted and the native chief stops the ceremony. When he sees Ann, he offers to trade six of his tribal women for the "golden woman". They refuse him and return to the ship.

That night, the natives kidnap Ann from the ship and take her through the gate and onto an altar, where she is offered to King Kong, a giant gorilla-like beast. Kong carries a terrified Ann away as Denham, Jack and some volunteers enter the jungle in hopes of rescuing her. They encounter a living dinosaur, a charging Stegosaurus, which they manage to kill. Soon after, the crew runs into an aggressive Brontosaurus and eventually Kong himself, leaving Jack and Denham as the only survivors. After Kong slays a Tyrannosaurus rex that tried to eat Ann, Jack continues to follow them while Denham returns to the village for more men. Upon arriving in Kong's mountain lair, Ann is menaced by a snake-like Elasmosaurus, which Kong also kills. While Kong is distracted killing a Pteranodon that tried to fly away with Ann, Jack reaches her and they climb down a vine dangling from a cliff ledge. When Kong notices and starts pulling them back up, the two drop into the water below. They run through the jungle and back to the village, where Denham, Englehorn, and the surviving crewmen are waiting. Kong, following, breaks open the gate and relentlessly rampages through the village. Onshore, Denham, now determined to bring Kong back alive, renders him unconscious with a gas bomb.

Shackled in chains, Kong is taken to New York City and presented to a Broadway theatre audience as "Kong, Eighth Wonder of the World!". Ann and Jack are brought on stage to join him, surrounded by a group of press photographers. Kong, believing that the ensuing flash photography is an attack, breaks loose as the audience flees in horror. Ann is whisked away to a hotel room on a high floor, but Kong, scaling the building, soon finds her. He rampages through the city as Ann screams in his grasp; wrecking a crowded elevated train and eventually climbing the Empire State Building. At its top, he is attacked by four biplanes. Kong destroys one, but finally succumbs to their gunfire. He gazes at Ann one last time before falling to his death. Jack takes an elevator to the top of the building and reunites with Ann. Denham arrives and pushes through a crowd surrounding Kong's corpse in the street. When a policeman remarks that the planes got him, Denham tells him, "No, it wasn't the airplanes. It was Beauty  killed the Beast".

Cast
 Fay Wray as Ann Darrow
 Robert Armstrong as Carl Denham
 Bruce Cabot as John "Jack" Driscoll
 Frank Reicher as Captain Englehorn
 Sam Hardy as Charles Weston
 Noble Johnson as the Native Chief
 Steve Clemente as the Witch King
 Victor Wong as Charlie
 Everett Brown as the Native in Ape Costume (uncredited)

Production

Development

King Kong producer Ernest B. Schoedsack had earlier monkey experience directing Chang: A Drama of the Wilderness (1927), also with Merian C. Cooper, and Rango (1931), both of which prominently featured monkeys in authentic jungle settings. Capitalizing on this trend, Congo Pictures released the hoax documentary Ingagi (1930), advertising the film as "an authentic incontestable celluloid document showing the sacrifice of a living woman to mammoth gorillas." Ingagi is now often recognized as a racial exploitation film as it implicitly depicted black women having sex with gorillas, and baby offspring that looked more ape than human. The film was an immediate hit, and by some estimates, it was one of the highest-grossing films of the 1930s at over $4 million. Although Cooper never listed Ingagi among his influences for King Kong, it has long been held that RKO greenlighted Kong because of the bottom-line example of Ingagi and the formula that "gorillas plus sexy women in peril equals enormous profits".

Special effects

King Kong is well known for its groundbreaking use of special effects, such as stop-motion animation, matte painting, rear projection and miniatures, all of which were conceived decades before the digital age.

The numerous prehistoric creatures inhabiting Skull Island were brought to life through the use of stop-motion animation by Willis H. O'Brien and his assistant animator, Buzz Gibson. The stop-motion animation scenes were painstaking and difficult to achieve and complete after the special effects crew realized that they could not stop because it would make the movements of the creatures seem inconsistent and the lighting would not have the same intensity over the many days it took to fully animate a finished sequence. A device called the surface gauge was used in order to keep track of the stop-motion animation performance. The iconic fight between Kong and the Tyrannosaurus took seven weeks to be completed. O'Brien's protégé, Ray Harryhausen, who later worked with him on several films, stated that O'Brien's second wife noticed that there was so much of her husband in Kong.

The backdrop of the island seen when the Venture crew first arrives was painted on glass by matte painters Henry Hillinck, Mario Larrinaga, and Byron C. Crabbé. The scene was then composited with separate bird elements and rear-projected behind the ship and the actors. The background of the scenes in the jungle (a miniature set) was also painted on several layers of glass to convey the illusion of deep and dense jungle foliage.

The most difficult task for the special effects crew to achieve was to make live-action footage interact with separately filmed stop-motion animation – to make the interaction between the humans and the creatures of the island seem believable. The most simple of these effects were accomplished by exposing part of the frame, then running the same piece of the film through the camera again by exposing the other part of the frame with a different image. The most complex shots, where the live-action actors interacted with the stop-motion animation, were achieved via two different techniques, the Dunning process and the Williams process, in order to produce the effect of a traveling matte. The Dunning process, invented by cinematographer Carroll H. Dunning, employed the use of blue and yellow lights that were filtered and photographed into the black-and-white film. Bi-packing of the camera was used for these types of effects. With it, the special effects crew could combine two strips of different films at the same time, creating the final composite shot in the camera. It was used in the climactic scene where one of the Curtiss Helldiver planes attacking Kong crashes from the top of the Empire State Building, and in the scene where natives are running through the foreground, while Kong is fighting other natives at the wall.

On the other hand, the Williams process, invented by cinematographer Frank D. Williams, did not require a system of colored lights and could be used for wider shots. It was used in the scene where Kong is shaking the sailors off the log, as well as the scene where Kong pushes the gates open. The Williams process did not use bipacking, but rather an optical printer, the first such device that synchronized a projector with a camera, so that several strips of film could be combined into a single composited image. Through the use of the optical printer, the special effects crew could film the foreground, the stop-motion animation, the live-action footage, and the background, and combine all of those elements into one single shot, eliminating the need to create the effects in the camera.

 Another technique that was used in combining live actors and stop-motion animation was rear-screen projection. The actor would have a translucent screen behind him where a projector would project footage onto the back of the translucent screen. The translucent screen was developed by Sidney Saunders and Fred Jackman, who received a Special Achievement Oscar. It was used in the famous scene where Kong and the Tyrannosaurus fight while Ann watches from the branches of a nearby tree. The stop-motion animation was filmed first. Fay Wray then spent a twenty-two-hour period sitting in a fake tree acting out her observation of the battle, which was projected onto the translucent screen while the camera filmed her witnessing the projected stop-motion battle. She was sore for days after the shoot. The same process was also used for the scene where sailors from the Venture kill a Stegosaurus.

O'Brien and his special effects crew also devised a way to use rear projection in miniature sets. A tiny screen was built into the miniature onto which live-action footage would then be projected. A fan was used to prevent the footage that was projected from melting or catching fire. This miniature rear projection was used in the scene where Kong is trying to grab Driscoll, who is hiding in a cave. The scene where Kong puts Ann at the top of a tree switched from a puppet in Kong's hand to projected footage of Ann sitting.

The scene where Kong fights the Tanystropheus in his lair was likely the most significant special effects achievement of the film, due to the way in which all of the elements in the sequence work together at the same time. The scene was accomplished through the use of a miniature set, stop-motion animation for Kong, background matte paintings, real water, foreground rocks with bubbling mud, smoke, and two miniature rear screen projections of Driscoll and Ann.

Over the years, some media reports have alleged that in certain scenes Kong was played by an actor wearing a gorilla suit. However, film historians have generally agreed that all scenes involving Kong were achieved with animated models.

Post-production
Murray Spivack provided the sound effects for the film. Kong's roar was created by mixing the recorded vocals of captive lions and tigers, subsequently played backward slowly. Spivak himself provided Kong's "love grunts" by grunting into a megaphone and playing it at a slow speed. For the huge ape's footsteps, Spivak stomped across a gravel-filled box with plungers wrapped in foam attached to his own feet, while the sounds of his chest beats were recorded by Spivak hitting his assistant (who had a microphone held to his back) on the chest with a drumstick. Spivak created the hisses and croaks of the dinosaurs with an air compressor for the former and his own vocals for the latter. The vocalizations of the Tyrannosaurus were additionally mixed in with puma screams while bird squawks were used for the Pteranodon. Spivak also provided the numerous screams of the various sailors; Fay Wray herself provided all of her character's screams in a single recording session.

The score was unlike any that came before and marked a significant change in the history of film music. King Kongs score was the first feature-length musical score written for an American "talkie" film, the first major Hollywood film to have a thematic score rather than background music, the first to mark the use of a 46-piece orchestra and the first to be recorded on three separate tracks (sound effects, dialogue, and music). Steiner used a number of new film scoring techniques, such as drawing upon opera conventions for his use of leitmotifs. Over the years, Steiner's score was recorded by multiple record labels and the original motion picture soundtrack has been issued on a compact disc.

Release

Censorship and restorations
The Production Code's stricter decency rules had been put into effect in Hollywood after its 1933 premiere and it was progressively censored further, with several scenes being either trimmed or excised altogether. These scenes were as follows: 
 The Brontosaurus mauling crewmen in the water, chasing one up a tree and killing him.
 Kong undressing Ann Darrow and sniffing his fingers.
 Kong biting and stepping on natives when he attacks the village.
 Kong biting a man in New York.
 Kong mistaking a sleeping woman for Ann and dropping her to her death, after realizing his mistake. 
 An additional scene portraying giant insects, spiders, a reptile-like predator and a tentacled creature devouring the crew members shaken off the log by Kong onto the floor of the canyon below was deemed too gruesome by RKO even by pre-Code standards, and thus the scene was studio self-censored prior to the original release. Though searched for, the footage is now considered to be lost forever, with the exception of only a few stills and pre-production drawings.

RKO did not preserve copies of the film's negative or release prints with the excised footage, and the cut scenes were considered lost for many years. In 1969, a 16mm print, including the censored footage, was found in Philadelphia. The cut scenes were added to the film, restoring it to its original theatrical running time of 100 minutes. This version was re-released to art houses by Janus Films in 1970. Over the next two decades, Universal Studios undertook further photochemical restoration of King Kong. This was based on a 1942 release print with missing censor cuts taken from a 1937 print, which "contained heavy vertical scratches from projection." An original release print located in the UK in the 1980s was found to contain the cut scenes in better quality. After a 6-year worldwide search for the best surviving materials, a further, fully digital restoration utilizing 4K resolution scanning was completed by Warner Bros. in 2005. This restoration also had a 4-minute overture added, bringing the overall running time to 104 minutes.

Somewhat controversially, King Kong was colorized for a 1989 Turner Home Entertainment video release. The following year, this colorized version was shown on Turner's TNT channel.

Television 
After the 1956 re-release, the film was sold to television (first being broadcast March 5, 1956).

Home media 
In 1984, King Kong was one of the first films to be released on LaserDisc by the Criterion Collection, and was the first movie to have an audio commentary track included. Criterion's audio commentary was by film historian Ron Haver; in 1985 Image Entertainment released another LaserDisc, this time with a commentary by film historian and soundtrack producer Paul Mandell. The Haver commentary was preserved in full on the FilmStruck streaming service. King Kong had numerous VHS and LaserDisc releases of varying quality prior to receiving an official studio release on DVD. Those included a Turner 60th-anniversary edition in 1993 featuring a front cover that had the sound effect of Kong roaring when his chest was pressed. It also included a 25-minute documentary, It Was Beauty Killed the Beast (1992). The documentary is also available on two different UK King Kong DVDs, while the colorized version is available on DVD in the UK and Italy. Warner Home Video re-released the black and white version on VHS in 1998 and again in 1999 under the Warner Bros. Classics label, with this release including the 25-minute 1992 documentary.

In 2005, Warner Bros. released its digital restoration of King Kong in a US 2-disc Special Edition DVD, coinciding with the theatrical release of Peter Jackson's remake. It had numerous extra features, including a new, third audio commentary by visual effects artists Ray Harryhausen and Ken Ralston, with archival excerpts from actress Fay Wray and producer/director Merian C. Cooper. Warners issued identical DVDs in 2006 in Australia and New Zealand, followed by a US digibook-packaged Blu-ray in 2010. In 2014, the Blu-ray was repackaged with three unrelated films in a 4 Film Favorites: Colossal Monster Collection. At present, Universal holds worldwide rights to Kongs home video releases outside of North America, the United Kingdom, Australia, and New Zealand. All of Universal's releases only contain the earlier, 100-minute, pre-2005 restoration.

Reception

Box office
The film was a box-office success, earning about $5 million in worldwide rentals on its initial release, and an opening weekend estimated at $90,000. Receipts fell by up to 50% during the second week of the film's release because of the national "bank holiday" declared by President Franklin D. Roosevelt's during his first days in office. During the film's first run it made a profit of $650,000. Prior to the 1952 re-release, the film is reported to have worldwide rentals of $2,847,000 including $1,070,000 from the United States and Canada and profits of $1,310,000. After the 1952 re-release, Variety estimated the film had earned an additional $1.6 million in the United States and Canada, bringing its total to $3.9 million in cumulative domestic (United States and Canada) rentals. Profits from the 1952 re-release were estimated by the studio at $2.5 million.

Critical response

The site's critical consensus reads, "King Kong explores the soul of a monster – making audiences scream and cry throughout the film – in large part due to Kong's breakthrough special effects." On Metacritic the film has a weighted average score of 90 out of 100, based on 12 critics, indicating "universal acclaim".

Variety thought the film was a powerful adventure. The New York Times gave readers an enthusiastic account of the plot and thought the film a fascinating adventure. John Mosher of The New Yorker called it "ridiculous", but wrote that there were "many scenes in this picture that are certainly diverting". The New York World-Telegram said it was "one of the very best of all the screen thrillers, done with all the cinema's slickest camera tricks". The Chicago Tribune called it "one of the most original, thrilling and mammoth novelties to emerge from a movie studio."

On February 3, 2002, Roger Ebert included King Kong in his "Great Movies" list, writing that "In modern times the movie has aged, as critic James Berardinelli observes, and 'advances in technology and acting have dated aspects of the production.' Yes, but in the very artificiality of some of the special effects, there is a creepiness that isn't there in today's slick, flawless, computer-aided images... Even allowing for its slow start, wooden acting, and wall-to-wall screaming, there is something ageless and primeval about King Kong that still somehow works."

Criticism of racism 
In the 19th and early 20th century, people of African descent were commonly represented visually as ape-like, a metaphor that fit racist stereotypes further bolstered by the emergence of scientific racism. Early films frequently mirrored racial tensions. While King Kong is often compared to the story of Beauty and the Beast, many film scholars have argued that the film was a cautionary tale about interracial romance, in which the film's "carrier of blackness is not a human being, but an ape".Kuhn, Annette. (2007). 'King Kong'. In: Cook, Pam. (ed.) The Cinema Book. London: British Film Institute. P,41. and Robinson, D. (1983). 'King Kong'. In: Lloyd, A. (ed.) Movies of the Thirties. Orbis Publishing Ltd. p.58.

Cooper and Schoedsack rejected any allegorical interpretations, insisting in interviews that the film's story contained no hidden meanings. In an interview, which was published posthumously, Cooper actually explained the deeper meaning of the film. The inspiration for the climactic scene came when, "as he was leaving his office in Manhattan, he heard the sound of an airplane motor. He reflexively looked up as the sun glinted off the wings of a plane flying extremely close to the tallest building in the city... he realized if he placed the giant gorilla on top of the tallest building in the world and had him shot down by the most modern of weapons, the armed airplane, he would have a story of the primitive doomed by modern civilization."

The film was initially banned in Nazi Germany, with the censors describing it as an "attack against the nerves of the German people" and a "violation of German race feeling". However, according to confidant Ernst Hanfstaengl, Adolf Hitler was "fascinated" by the film and saw it several times.

Legacy

The film has since received some significant honors. In 1975, Kong was named one of the 50 best American films by the American Film Institute. In 1981, a video game titled Donkey Kong, starring a character with similarities to Kong, was released. In 1991, the film was deemed "culturally, historically and aesthetically significant" by the Library of Congress and selected for preservation in the United States National Film Registry. In 1998, the AFI ranked the film #43 on its list of the 100 greatest movies of all time.

After a successful re-release in 1952, the film also paved the way for many films centered around Giant Monsters, and is one of the biggest inspirations for films such as The Beast from 20,000 Fathoms and Godzilla, with Tomoyuki Tanaka (the creator of Godzilla) stating, "I felt like doing something big. That was my motivation. I thought of different ideas. I like monster movies, and I was influenced by 'King Kong'."American Film Institute Lists'''
 AFI's 100 Years...100 Movies – #43
 AFI's 100 Years...100 Thrills – #12
 AFI's 100 Years...100 Passions – #24
 AFI's 100 Years...100 Heroes and Villains:
 Kong – Nominated Villain 
 AFI's 100 Years...100 Movie Quotes:
 "Oh, no, it wasn't the airplanes. It was Beauty killed the Beast." – #84
 AFI's 100 Years of Film Scores – #13
 AFI's 100 Years...100 Movies (10th Anniversary Edition) – #41
 AFI's 10 Top 10 – #4 Fantasy film

Sequel and franchise
The 1933 King Kong film and characters inspired imitations and installments. The Son of Kong, a direct sequel to the 1933 film was released nine months after the first film's release. In the early 1960s, RKO had licensed the King Kong character to Japanese studio Toho and produced two King Kong films, King Kong vs. Godzilla which was also the third film in Toho's long-running  Godzilla series, and King Kong Escapes, both directed by Ishirō Honda. These films are mostly unrelated to the original and follow a very different style.

In 1976, Italian producer Dino De Laurentiis released his version of King Kong, a modern remake of the 1933 film, following the same basic plot, but moving the setting to the present day and changing many details. The remake was followed by a sequel in 1986 titled King Kong Lives.

In 1998, the film also saw a loosely-adapted direct-to-video animated remake, The Mighty Kong, directed by Art Scott, scored by the Sherman Brothers and distributed by Warner Bros.

In 2005, Universal Pictures released another remake of King Kong, co-written and directed by Peter Jackson, which is set in 1933, as in the original film.

Legendary Pictures and Warner Bros. released a Kong reboot film titled Kong: Skull Island in 2017 which was directed by Jordan Vogt-Roberts and is the second installment of Legendary's MonsterVerse, with a sequel Godzilla vs. Kong directed by Adam Wingard released in 2021, marking the second time Kong fights Godzilla.

See also

 List of films featuring giant monsters
 List of stop motion films
 1933 in film
 List of highest-grossing films
 Skull Island
 Mighty Joe Young (1949)
 The Lost World (1925)
 Ingagi (1930)
 Stark Mad (1929)

References

Bibliography
 
 Annette, Kuhn. (2007). 'King Kong'. In: Cook, Pam. (ed.) The Cinema Book. London: British Film Institute. P,41. and Robinson, D. (1983). 'King Kong'. In: Lloyd, A. (ed.) Movies of the Thirties. Orbis Publishing Ltd.
 
 Eagan, Daniel (2010). America's Film Legacy: The Authoritative Guide to the Landmark Movies in the National Film Registry. The Continuum International Publishing Group Inc, New York, NY p. 22. 
 
 
 
 Grant, Elizabeth. (1996). "Here Comes the Bride." In Grant, Barry Keith (ed.), The Dread of Difference: Gender and the Horror Film. Austin: University of Texas Press.
 
 
 
 
 
 
 
 
 Ollier, Claude. (May–June 1965). "Un roi à New York (A King in New York)" (Milne, Tom, trans.), in Hillier, Jim (ed.), Cahiers du Cinéma: The 1960s: New Wave, New Cinema, Reevaluating Hollywood, Harvard University Press, 1986.
 
 
 

External links

 King Kong essay by Michael Price on the National Film Registry website 
 
 
 
 
 
 
 King Kong'' essay by Daniel Eagan in America's Film Legacy: The Authoritative Guide to the Landmark Movies in the National Film Registry, A&C Black, 2010 , pages 205-207 
 
 List of the 400 nominated screen characters 

1933 films
1933 horror films
1930s fantasy adventure films
1930s English-language films
1930s monster movies
American films with live action and animation
American black-and-white films
American fantasy adventure films
American monster movies
American epic films
Adventure horror films
Censored films
Films about dinosaurs
Empire State Building in fiction
Films scored by Max Steiner
Films directed by Ernest B. Schoedsack
Films directed by Merian C. Cooper
Films about filmmaking
Films adapted into comics
Films adapted into plays
Films produced by David O. Selznick
Films set in New York City
Films set in the Indian Ocean
Films set on fictional islands
Films set on ships
Films using stop-motion animation
King Kong (franchise) films
Lost world films
Pterosaurs in fiction
United States National Film Registry films
RKO Pictures films
Films with screenplays by Edgar Wallace
Articles containing video clips
Living dinosaurs in fiction
Race-related controversies in film
1930s American films